GR Andromedae (often abbreviated to GR And) is a variable star in the constellation Andromeda. Its apparent visual magnitude varies between 6.87 and 6.95 in a cycle of 518.2 days. It is classified as an α2 Canum Venaticorum variable.

Spectrum
The radiation emitted by GP Andromedae is a typical stellar blackbody with absorption lines from various elements, which gives to the star a spectral type A2pSrCrEu, meaning that unusually strong lines of strontium, chromium and europium can be observed. GP Andromedae is thus classified as an Ap star. The intensity and profile of the spectral lines varies within a cycle with the same period as the brightness variations.

Variability
Photometric and spectral variability of GR Andromedae is typical of a star with a strong and variable magnetic field. This way, the 518.2 days periodicity can be identified as the rotation period of the star. It's among the slowest rotators in the category of magnetic chemically peculiar stars, with a calculated equatorial rotation rate of only .

References

Andromeda (constellation)
Andromedae, GR
J00282858+3226159
BD+31 59
002243
002453
Alpha2 Canum Venaticorum variables
Ap stars
A-type main-sequence stars